Hamden Township is a township in Becker County, Minnesota, United States. The population was 220 as of the 2000 census.

Geography

Lakes
 Bay Lake
 Boe Lake
 Cravath Lake (north half)
 Hamden Lake
 Hoefendahl Lake
 Larson Lake
 Pearce Lake
 Seabold Lake

Adjacent townships
 Riceville Township (north)
 Callaway Township (northeast)
 Richwood Township (east)
 Detroit Township (southeast)
 Audubon Township (south)
 Lake Park Township (southwest)
 Cuba Township (west)

Cemeteries
The township contains these two cemeteries: Larson and Saron Lutheran.

Demographics
As of the census of 2000, there were 220 people, 81 households, and 61 families residing in the township.  The population density was 6.5 people per square mile (2.5/km2).  There were 86 housing units at an average density of 2.5/sq mi (1.0/km2).  The racial makeup of the township was 95.91% White, 1.36% Native American, and 2.73% from two or more races.

There were 81 households, out of which 29.6% had children under the age of 18 living with them, 69.1% were married couples living together, 1.2% had a female householder with no husband present, and 23.5% were non-families. 18.5% of all households were made up of individuals, and 6.2% had someone living alone who was 65 years of age or older.  The average household size was 2.72 and the average family size was 3.10.

In the township the population was spread out, with 25.9% under the age of 18, 9.1% from 18 to 24, 22.3% from 25 to 44, 32.7% from 45 to 64, and 10.0% who were 65 years of age or older.  The median age was 40 years. For every 100 females, there were 129.2 males.  For every 100 females age 18 and over, there were 126.4 males.

The median income for a household in the township was $43,333, and the median income for a family was $44,583. Males had a median income of $31,818 versus $21,875 for females. The per capita income for the township was $19,353.  About 4.5% of families and 6.9% of the population were below the poverty line, including 10.2% of those under the age of eighteen and 4.5% of those 65 or over.

References
 United States National Atlas
 United States Census Bureau 2007 TIGER/Line Shapefiles
 United States Board on Geographic Names (GNIS)

Townships in Becker County, Minnesota
Townships in Minnesota